"Nothing Changes Around Here" is the first single taken from The Thrills' third album Teenager.  The band sang the track live on the RTÉ One television show "Saturday Night With Miriam" on Saturday 14 July 2007.

The single reached number 40 in the UK Singles Chart, becoming their sixth UK top 40 hit.

Track listing

Charts

External links
Music Video At Youtube.com

References

2007 singles
The Thrills songs
Virgin Records singles
2007 songs